The women's competition at the 2012 Olympic Games in London was held from 5 to 9 August at the ExCeL Exhibition Centre.

For the first time at an Olympic Games, the 10 men's boxing events were joined by three women's events: flyweight, middleweight, and lightweight.

Nicola Adams from Great Britain won the gold medal — the first Olympic gold ever awarded in women's boxing.

Competition format
The competition consisted of a single-elimination tournament. Bronze medals were awarded to both semi-final losers, Marlen Esparza of the United States and Mary Kom of India. Each bout comprised four rounds of two minutes each.

Schedule 
All times are British Summer Time (UTC+01:00)

Results

References

Boxing at the 2012 Summer Olympics
2012 in women's boxing
Women's events at the 2012 Summer Olympics